Ten Point Program may refer to:

 Ten-Point Program (Black Panther Party), a set of guidelines to the Black Panther Party
 PLO's Ten Point Program, the 1974 plan accepted by the Palestinian National Council for the liberation of Palestinian territory
 Ten Point Programme for Reunification of the Country, a 1993 plan written by Kim Il-sung to re-unite North Korea and South Korea
Ten-Point Program of the National Resistance Movement; see Economic history of Uganda
Helmut Kohl's ten-point program; see German reunification